Danielle Susan Allen (born November 3, 1971) is the James Bryant Conant University Professor at Harvard University. She is also the Director of the Edmond & Lily Safra Center for Ethics at Harvard Kennedy School. 

Prior to joining the faculty at Harvard in 2015, Allen was UPS Foundation Professor at the Institute for Advanced Study in Princeton, New Jersey. Allen is the daughter of political scientist William B. Allen.

Allen was a contributing columnist at The Washington Post until she announced in December 2020 that she was exploring a run for Governor of Massachusetts in 2022. She formally announced her campaign for the Democratic Party nomination in June 2021, but then dropped out of the race in February 2022.

Education and academic career 
Allen graduated from Princeton University in 1993 with an A.B. in Classics. She earned summa cum laude honors and an induction into Phi Beta Kappa. Allen completed a 178-page senior thesis, titled "The State of Judgment", under the supervision of Andre Laks. As a Marshall Scholar, she studied at King's College at the University of Cambridge, where she received an M.Phil. in classics in 1994 and a Ph.D. in classics in 1996. Allen then pursued further graduate studies at Harvard University, earning an M.A. in government in 1998 and a Ph.D. in government in 2001. From 1997 to 2007, she served on the faculty of the University of Chicago, earning appointments as a professor of both classics and political science, as well as membership on the university's Committee on Social Thought. She served as Dean of the Division of the Humanities from 2004 to 2007. She organized The Dewey Seminar: Education, Schools and the State, with Rob Reich.

She is a former trustee of Amherst College and Princeton University, and is a past chair of the Pulitzer Prize board where she served from 2007 to 2015. She was the UPS Foundation Professor at the Institute for Advanced Study in Princeton, before joining the Harvard faculty and becoming director of the Safra Center in 2015.

Her scholarly contributions have been widely recognized. She was named a MacArthur Foundation Fellow in 2001, in recognition of her combining “the classicist’s careful attention to texts and language with the political theorist’s sophisticated and informed engagement”. An elected member of the American Academy of Arts and Sciences and the American Philosophical Society, Allen is a past chair of the Mellon Foundation board of trustees.

The New Yorker published Allen's "The Life of a South Central Statistic" in its July 24, 2017 issue.

Together with Stephen B. Heintz and Eric Liu, Allen chaired the bipartisan Commission on the Practice of Democratic Citizenship of the American Academy of Arts and Sciences. The commission, which was launched "to explore how best to respond to the weaknesses and vulnerabilities in our political and civic life and to enable more Americans to participate as effective citizens in a diverse 21st-century democracy", issued a report, titled Our Common Purpose: Reinventing American Democracy for the 21st Century, in June 2020. The report included strategies and policy recommendations "to help the nation emerge as a more resilient democracy by 2026".

In October 2022, Allen joined the Council for Responsible Social Media project launched by Issue One to address the negative mental, civic, and public health impacts of social media in the United States co-chaired by former House Democratic Caucus Leader Dick Gephardt and former Massachusetts Lieutenant Governor Kerry Healey.

Political career

Allen announced in December 2020 that she would explore a candidacy in the 2022 Massachusetts gubernatorial race. She announced on February 15, 2022 that she had no path, and ended her campaign on "pure math."

Personal life
Allen was born in Takoma Park, Maryland, U.S., but was raised in Claremont, California where her father taught at Harvey Mudd College. She graduated from Claremont High School.

Her father, William B. Allen, is a political philosopher and former chairman of the U.S. Civil Rights Commission. Her mother, Susan, was a research librarian. She is married to James Doyle with two children.

Awards and honors

1993 Marshall Scholar
2001 Quantrell Award for Excellence 
2001 MacArthur Fellows Program
2009 Member of the American Academy of Arts and Sciences
2015 Francis Parkman Prize
2017 James Bryant Conant University Professor
2018 Doctor of Humane Letters, Amherst College
2020 John W. Kluge Prize, Library of Congress

Works
 
 )
 
 
 
 
 .

See also

 William B. Allen – father

References

External links

Campaign website

"An interview with Danielle S. Allen", University of Chicago Press, 2004. About Talking to Strangers.
Mosk, Matthew, "An Attack That Came Out of the Ether", The Washington Post, June 28, 2008
American Denial, PBS Independent Lens, broadcast February 22, 2015. Featured interview.
Harvard professor Danielle Allen exploring run for governor

1971 births
Living people
African-American academics
American women political scientists
American political scientists
Fellows of the American Academy of Arts and Sciences
MacArthur Fellows
Harvard Graduate School of Arts and Sciences alumni
Institute for Advanced Study faculty
University of Chicago faculty
Princeton University alumni
Alumni of King's College, Cambridge
21st-century American women scientists
21st-century American scientists
Marshall Scholars
American women academics
21st-century African-American women
21st-century African-American scientists
20th-century African-American people
20th-century African-American women
The Washington Post columnists